Rowley Regis Community Hospital is a hospital in Rowley Regis, West Midlands, England. It is managed by the Sandwell and West Birmingham Hospitals NHS Trust.

History
The hospital was opened by the Duchess of Kent in 1994. Rowley Regis Hospital along with City Hospital, Birmingham and Sandwell General Hospital, West Bromwich formed the Sandwell and West Birmingham Hospitals NHS Trust in 2002. The Chancellor of the Exchequer, George Osborne, visited the hospital in July 2014.

References

External links

Hospital buildings completed in 1994
Hospitals in Birmingham, West Midlands
Rowley Regis
NHS hospitals in England